Shinyungwe is a settlement that is situated  east of Rundu in the Kavango East region of Namibia.

Shinyungwe Combined School is located at the village. Namibian athlete Christine Mboma is from Shinyungwe.

References

Populated places in Kavango East